Hanna Thuvik (born 17 May 2002) is a Swedish ice hockey forward, currently playing for Brynäs IF in the Swedish Women's Hockey League (SDHL).

Career 
Thuvik grew up in Skärhamn, playing for the junior boys' teams of Rönnängs IK, eight kilometres away in a neighbouring town. In 2016, at the age of 14, she was offered a contract with senior-club Trollhättans HC in Damtvåan. She scored 40 points in 8 games as the team earned promotion to Damettan.

Ahead of the 2018–19 season, she signed with top-flight club Göteborg HC. She scored 10 points in 36 games in her debut SDHL season, as the club finished in last but were able to keep their top-flight place after a successful relegation playoff. She was named an assistant captain for Göteborg for the 2019–20 season, where she almost doubled her point production, scoring 17 points in 32 games.

In the 2020 off-season, she left Göteborg to sign with Brynäs IF.

International career 
Thuvik has represented Sweden at the 2019 and 2020 IIHF World Women's U18 Championship. She participated in her first senior national team camp in August 2020, being called up as a replacement for the injured Hanna Olsson.

References

External links

2002 births
Living people
Brynäs IF Dam players
Göteborg HC players
People from Tjörn Municipality
Sportspeople from Västra Götaland County
Swedish women's ice hockey centres
Swedish women's ice hockey forwards
21st-century Swedish women